Abraeus loebli is a beetle discovered by and Yves Gomy och Ôhara in 2001. No sub-species listed in Catalogue of Life.

References

Histeridae
Beetles described in 2001